Mohamed Reda El Aaraby (born 12 November 1989) is a Moroccan long-distance runner who specializes in the marathon. In 2019, he competed in the men's marathon at the 2019 World Athletics Championships held in Doha, Qatar. He did not finish his race.

He finished 11th in the men's marathon at the 2020 Summer Olympics. He finished 2nd in the 2021 TCS New York City Marathon.

Personal bests
Outdoor
1500 metres – 3:47.51 (Rabat 2010)
3000 metres – 8:06.25 (Montgeron 2015)
5000 metres – 13:42.53 (Kortrijk 2016)
10,000 metres – 28:44.25 (Wuhan 2019)
Half marathon – 59:54 (Málaga 2022)
Marathon – 2:06:55 (Paris 2022)

Road
10 kilometres – 27:58 (Valencia 2019)

References

External links
 
 
 
 

1989 births
Living people
Moroccan male long-distance runners
World Athletics Championships athletes for Morocco
Athletes (track and field) at the 2019 African Games
Mediterranean Games gold medalists in athletics
Mediterranean Games gold medalists for Morocco
Moroccan male marathon runners
African Games competitors for Morocco
Athletes (track and field) at the 2018 Mediterranean Games
Athletes (track and field) at the 2020 Summer Olympics
Olympic athletes of Morocco
20th-century Moroccan people
21st-century Moroccan people